The Bear Deluxe is a Portland, Oregon-based magazine dedicated to environmental writing, literature, and visual art. The magazine was established by  Orlo, a non-profit in 1992.  It is released by Orlo. The magazine is published on a biannual basis.

The Bear Deluxe has received grants from the Oregon Arts Commission, the Regional Arts & Culture Council, and the Oregon Cultural Trust.

The magazine sponsors the Doug Fir, an annual fiction award. Past judges of Doug Fir have included Katherine Dunn, Rivka Galchen, Brian Doyle, and Jonathan Raymond.

Writing from The Bear Deluxe has been reprinted in Utne Reader.

Thomas "Tom" Webb is The Bear Deluxes co-founder and current editor-in-chief.

The magazine was previously called The Bear Essential.

See also
List of literary magazines
List of art magazines

References

External links
 Bear Deluxe Site
 Review of Issue #28
 Interview with Jonathan Raymond

1992 establishments in Oregon
American contemporary art
Biannual magazines published in the United States
Contemporary art magazines
Environmental magazines
Magazines established in 1992
Magazines published in Portland, Oregon
Visual arts magazines published in the United States